The Panama amazon, also known as the Panama yellow-headed amazon, (Amazona ochrocephala panamensis) is a subspecies of the yellow-crowned amazon, and is endemic to Panama (including the Pearl Islands and Coiba) and northwest Colombia. In aviculture, it is sometimes listed as a separate species (Amazona panamensis), and this is potentially correct; at least as a phylogenetic species.

Description
The plumage of the body is green with a little coloring at the brims of the wings. The yellow on the crown is more restricted, and tends to be triangular, compared with the more extensive and rounder distribution of yellow on the nominate race. There is much variation in coloring among individuals.

Aviculture
Because they are highly sought after as pets and because of trapping of wild birds, which is now illegal, there has been a population decline. This has made them difficult to find. Panama amazons are extremely playful, can be excellent talkers and tend to be loud at times; much like the (nominate) yellow-crowned, yellow-headed and yellow-naped amazons. Though their body language is the same, Panama amazons are much less likely to become physically aggressive. Many other amazon parrots are erroneously sold as Panama amazons, because of their scarcity and popularity.

References

Panama amazon
Birds of Panama
Birds of Colombia
Least concern biota of North America
Panama amazon